Chanoine is a surname. Notable people with the surname include:

Charles Chanoine (1835–1915), French military officer
Jay Chanoine (born 1986/87), American stand-up comedian
Roger Chanoine (1976–2016), American football player

English-language surnames